Mount Carmel High  School was established in Gaggal, Himachal Pradesh, India on 21 March 2000, with 55 students. As of 2011 it has over 1600 students on  roll.  The mixed school is affiliated to the Indian Certificate Of Secondary Education (ICSE). The principal is Sr.Joshly FCC. The school is operated by  Mount Carmel School Society, a registered educational society and is based on Catholic church-based organization. Since 2013, two batches have successfully passed out through the school. The Director Of The School Is Fr.Christo. The School Contains A Staff Of Almost 50 Teachers.It is a modern school which is a sub school including other 11 schools. The School has various Facilities. Till now 8 batches have passed out from this school. It is the top and one of the best schools of the area.

High schools and secondary schools in Himachal Pradesh
Christian schools in Himachal Pradesh
2000 establishments in Himachal Pradesh
Educational institutions established in 2000